"Baby Sitter" is a song by American rapper DaBaby featuring fellow American rapper Offset of Migos from the former's debut studio album Baby on Baby (2019). It was released to rhythmic contemporary radio on August 13, 2019, as the album's second single. The song was produced by Go Grizzly and MariiBeatz.

Composition
In the song, DaBaby raps about how he cannot resist trying to have sexual intercourse with a woman in his presence. In the chorus, he talks about wanting to fool around with the "baby sitter". Meanwhile, Offset's contributing verse outlines keeping his girl under control by ensuring she is not trying to make him lose his wealth and fame.

Live performances
DaBaby performed the song with Offset at the 2019 BET Hip Hop Awards.

Music video
The music video was released on April 3, 2019 and was directed by Reel Goats. Inspired by The Fresh Prince of Bel-Air television series, the visual finds DaBaby and Offset as brothers. While their "White step dad" is gone with a babysitter in charge, the rappers cause mischief around their sprawling Beverly Hills mansion. DaBaby's song "Pony" plays in the credits, and the clip ends with DaBaby being reprimanded by his father.

Charts

Weekly charts

Year-end charts

Certifications

References

2019 singles
2019 songs
DaBaby songs
Offset (rapper) songs
Songs written by DaBaby
Songs written by Offset (rapper)
Interscope Records singles